Triángulo de Amor Bizarro, is the first album by the Galician band Triángulo de Amor Bizarro, released in 2007 by Mushroom Pillow. The album received wide acclaim and was ranked as one of the best albums of the year and the decade by three publications.

Track listing

Accolades

References

External links

2007 albums